Obed Benjamin Sullivan (born January 17, 1968) is an American former professional boxer. Nicknamed "The Fighting Marine", Sullivan was at times a highly ranked heavyweight who fought many significant fighters of his era.

Sullivan turned pro in 1992 and accumulated a 28-1-1 record with an International Boxing Federation intercontinental belt and wins over the likes of Garing Lane, Levi Billups, James Gaines, and Marion Wilson, setting up a bout with fellow rising prospect Hasim Rahman in 1997 on HBO.  Sullivan held his own and lost a majority decision.

After the loss to Rahman, Sullivan began 1998 by knocking out 33-1 Keith McKnight, but then would be stopped in the ninth round after a tough battle with undefeated contender Michael Grant. He then lost against Jesse Ferguson.

In 1999, he lost a split decision to Derrick Jefferson, and traveled to Germany for a WBO heavyweight title challenge to Vitali Klitschko, where Sullivan quit on his stool after nine rounds.
He lost a short match in 2000 against David Tua and later in the year fought Larry Donald to a draw.

Professional boxing record

|-
|align="center" colspan=8|41 Wins (30 knockouts, 11 decisions), 9 Losses (4 knockouts, 5 decisions), 2 Draws, 2 No Contests
|-
| align="center" style="border-style: none none solid solid; background: #e3e3e3"|Result
| align="center" style="border-style: none none solid solid; background: #e3e3e3"|Record
| align="center" style="border-style: none none solid solid; background: #e3e3e3"|Opponent
| align="center" style="border-style: none none solid solid; background: #e3e3e3"|Type
| align="center" style="border-style: none none solid solid; background: #e3e3e3"|Round
| align="center" style="border-style: none none solid solid; background: #e3e3e3"|Date
| align="center" style="border-style: none none solid solid; background: #e3e3e3"|Location
| align="center" style="border-style: none none solid solid; background: #e3e3e3"|Notes
|-align=center
|Loss
|
|align=left| James Porter
|SD
|4
|20/01/2007
|align=left| Columbus, Ohio, U.S.
|align=left|
|-
|Win
|
|align=left| Chavez Francisco
|TKO
|5
|02/04/2004
|align=left| Warren, Michigan, U.S.
|align=left|
|-
|Win
|
|align=left| Ken Murphy
|TKO
|4
|09/01/2004
|align=left| Warren, Michigan, U.S.
|align=left|
|-
|Loss
|
|align=left| Fres Oquendo
|TKO
|11
|02/09/2001
|align=left| Choctaw, Mississippi, U.S.
|align=left|
|-
|Win
|
|align=left| Sherman Williams
|SD
|12
|20/05/2001
|align=left| Elizabeth, Indiana, U.S.
|align=left|
|-
|Win
|
|align=left| Agustin Corpus
|TKO
|5
|17/03/2001
|align=left| Philadelphia, Mississippi, U.S.
|align=left|
|-
|Win
|
|align=left| Jesus Valadez
|TKO
|4
|25/01/2001
|align=left| Houston, Texas, U.S.
|align=left|
|-
|Draw
|
|align=left| Larry Donald
|MD
|12
|28/11/2000
|align=left| Paradise, Nevada, U.S.
|align=left|
|-
|Win
|
|align=left| Don Normand
|TKO
|3
|21/09/2000
|align=left| Houston, Texas, U.S.
|align=left|
|-
|Loss
|
|align=left| David Tua
|KO
|1
|03/06/2000
|align=left| Paradise, Nevada, U.S.
|align=left|
|-
|Win
|
|align=left| Jeff Lally
|TKO
|3
|01/04/2000
|align=left| Laughlin, Nevada, U.S.
|align=left|
|-
|Loss
|
|align=left| Vitali Klitschko
|RTD
|9
|11/12/1999
|align=left| Alsterdorf, Hamburg, Germany
|align=left|
|-
|Win
|
|align=left| Matt Green
|KO
|3
|06/11/1999
|align=left| Atlantic City, New Jersey, U.S.
|align=left|
|-
|Win
|
|align=left| Ronnie Smith
|TKO
|3
|21/10/1999
|align=left| Houston, Texas, U.S.
|align=left|
|-
|Win
|
|align=left| Ricardo Kennedy
|TKO
|3
|16/09/1999
|align=left| Biloxi, Mississippi, U.S.
|align=left|
|-
|Win
|
|align=left| Everett Martin
|TKO
|4
|13/08/1999
|align=left| Bossier City, Louisiana, U.S.
|align=left|
|-
|Loss
|
|align=left| Derrick Jefferson
|SD
|12
|20/05/1999
|align=left| Tunica, Mississippi, U.S.
|align=left|
|-
|Win
|
|align=left| Biko Botowamungu
|PTS
|10
|19/02/1999
|align=left| Poznań, Poland
|align=left|
|-
|Loss
|
|align=left| Jesse Ferguson
|SD
|10
|08/12/1998
|align=left| New York City, U.S.
|align=left|
|-
|Loss
|
|align=left| "Big" Michael Grant
|TKO
|9
|30/05/1998
|align=left| Atlantic City, New Jersey, U.S.
|align=left|
|-
|Win
|
|align=left| Keith McKnight
|KO
|7
|24/02/1998
|align=left| Mashantucket, Connecticut, U.S.
|align=left|
|-
|Loss
|
|align=left| Hasim Rahman
|MD
|12
|01/11/1997
|align=left| New York City, U.S.
|align=left|
|-
|Win
|
|align=left| Carlos Monroe
|UD
|10
|16/09/1997
|align=left| Nashville, Tennessee, U.S.
|align=left|
|-
|Win
|
|align=left| Garing Lane
|UD
|10
|14/08/1997
|align=left| Worley, Idaho, U.S.
|align=left|
|-
|Win
|
|align=left| Jesse Shelby
|TKO
|3
|12/07/1997
|align=left| Tunica, Mississippi, U.S.
|align=left|
|-
|Win
|
|align=left| Isaac Brown
|TKO
|2
|05/06/1997
|align=left| Atlantic City, New Jersey, U.S.
|align=left|
|-
|Win
|
|align=left| Levi Billups
|TKO
|12
|08/04/1997
|align=left| Biloxi, Mississippi, U.S.
|align=left|
|-
|Win
|
|align=left| Sam Hampton
|UD
|12
|17/12/1996
|align=left| Pikesville, Maryland, U.S.
|align=left|
|-
|Win
|
|align=left| Will Hinton
|TKO
|5
|03/10/1996
|align=left| Houston, Texas, U.S.
|align=left|
|-
|Win
|
|align=left| Arthur Weathers
|TKO
|2
|25/09/1996
|align=left| Worley, Idaho, U.S.
|align=left|
|-
|Win
|
|align=left| Martin Foster
|KO
|3
|24/08/1996
|align=left| Albuquerque, New Mexico, U.S.
|align=left|
|-
|Win
|
|align=left| James Gaines
|MD
|12
|18/07/1996
|align=left| Boston, Massachusetts, U.S.
|align=left|
|-
|Win
|
|align=left| Bradley Rone
|TKO
|4
|27/06/1996
|align=left| Houston, Texas, U.S.
|align=left|
|-
|style="background:#DDD"|
|
|align=left| Buster Mathis, Jr.
|NC
|5
|20/04/1996
|align=left| Grand Forks, North Dakota, U.S.
|align=left|
|-
|Win
|
|align=left| Cleveland Woods
|KO
|2
|09/04/1996
|align=left| Indio, California, U.S.
|align=left|
|-
|Win
|
|align=left| Olian Alexander
|TKO
|2
|09/03/1996
|align=left| Atlantic City, New Jersey, U.S.
|align=left|
|-
|Win
|
|align=left| Terry Davis
|TKO
|5
|13/01/1996
|align=left| Atlantic City, New Jersey, U.S.
|align=left|
|-
|Win
|
|align=left| Marion Wilson
|MD
|10
|13/12/1995
|align=left| Atlantic City, New Jersey, U.S.
|align=left|
|-
|Win
|
|align=left| Ken Smith
|KO
|3
|05/12/1995
|align=left| Biloxi, Mississippi, U.S.
|align=left|
|-
|Win
|
|align=left| Calvin Veasley
|TKO
|4
|06/10/1995
|align=left| Atlantic City, New Jersey, U.S.
|align=left|
|-
|Win
|
|align=left| Thomas Williams
|TKO
|4
|09/09/1995
|align=left| Fort Worth, Texas, U.S.
|align=left|
|-
|style="background:#DDD"|
|
|align=left| Martin Foster
|NC
|8
|27/07/1995
|align=left| Irvine, California, U.S.
|align=left|
|-
|Win
|
|align=left| Curtis Shepard
|KO
|1
|17/06/1995
|align=left| Paradise, Nevada, U.S.
|align=left|
|-
|Win
|
|align=left| Levi Billups
|SD
|8
|26/01/1995
|align=left| Irvine, California, U.S.
|align=left|
|-
|Win
|
|align=left| Jeff Hollins
|KO
|4
|17/12/1994
|align=left| Palm Springs, California, U.S.
|align=left|
|-
|Win
|
|align=left|"Handy" Randy Wilson
|KO
|4
|06/12/1994
|align=left| Scottsdale, Arizona, U.S.
|align=left|
|-
|Win
|
|align=left| Jim Mullen
|KO
|5
|02/11/1994
|align=left| Woodland Hills, California, U.S.
|align=left|
|-
|Draw
|
|align=left| Ahmed Abdin
|PTS
|6
|13/10/1994
|align=left| Houston, Texas, U.S.
|align=left|
|-
|Win
|
|align=left| Jeff Hollins
|UD
|4
|09/09/1994
|align=left| Scottsdale, Arizona, U.S.
|align=left|
|-
|Win
|
|align=left| Jeff Hollins
|UD
|4
|23/08/1994
|align=left| Scottsdale, Arizona, U.S.
|align=left|
|-
|Win
|
|align=left|Paul Hirsch
|TKO
|2
|30/07/1994
|align=left| Tucson, Arizona, U.S.
|align=left|
|-
|Loss
|
|align=left| Jonathan Grant
|UD
|4
|25/06/1994
|align=left| Paradise, Nevada, U.S.
|align=left|
|-
|Win
|
|align=left|Daniel Moore
|UD
|4
|16/06/1994
|align=left| North Las Vegas, Nevada, U.S.
|align=left|
|-
|Win
|
|align=left|Mike Davis
|KO
|1
|27/08/1992
|align=left| San Diego, California, U.S.
|align=left|
|}

References

External links
 
 Obed Sullivan's Official Homepage

1968 births
Living people
Heavyweight boxers
Boxers from Mississippi
Sportspeople from Gulfport, Mississippi
American male boxers
United States Marines